Pisa is a city in Tuscany, Italy.

Pisa or PISA may also refer to:

Places
 Province of Pisa, a province in the Tuscany region of Italy
 Republic of Pisa, a de facto independent state centered on the Tuscan city of Pisa during the 10th and 11th centuries
 Pisa, Greece or Pisatis, an ancient Greek town in Elis
 Pisa (river), Poland

Ships
 Pisa-class cruiser, a class of three armoured cruisers built in the early 20th century
 Italian cruiser Pisa, the lead ship of the class
 , a transatlantic passenger steamship

People
 Alberto Pisa (1864-1936), Italian painter
 Aleš Píša (born 1977), Czech ice hockey player
 Apisaloma Pisa Tinoisamoa (born 1981), American former National Football League player

PISA
 Penang International Sports Arena, Malaysia
 Primary Industries South Australia, defunct South Australian government agency whose merges formed PIRSA
 Programme for International Student Assessment, an OECD survey
 The Protein Interfaces, Surfaces and Assemblies server, a bioinformatics web application

Other uses
 Pisa (genus), a genus of crabs
 University of Pisa, Pisa, Italy
 A.C. Pisa 1909, an Italian football club, formerly Pisa Calcio
 Pisa language, spoken in Papua, Indonesia

See also

 
 
 Francisco de Pisa (1534–1616), Spanish historian and writer
 Calcedonio Di Pisa (1931-1962), member of the Sicilian Mafia
 Pissa (disambiguation)
 Pizza (disambiguation)